is a 2010 "found footage" black comedy film directed by Kōji Shiraishi and Akihiro Kasai.

Plot
Following a shoot gone wrong, director Koji Shiraishi finds himself forced to employ two violent criminals in his future productions.

Production
The film is a remake of one of Shiraishi's earlier works.

See also
The Curse (2005), another "found footage" mockumentary by the same director
Occult (2009), another "found footage" mockumentary by the same director
Shirome (2010), another "found footage" mockumentary from the same director
Chō Akunin (2011), another "found footage" mockumentary from the same director

References

External links
 

2010 films
2010 black comedy films
Found footage films
2010s mockumentary films
Films directed by Kōji Shiraishi
Japanese comedy horror films
2010 comedy horror films
Japanese psychological horror films
Japanese supernatural horror films
Supernatural comedy films
Psychological comedy films
Films about film directors and producers
2010s Japanese films